The 51st Annual Grammy Awards took place at the Staples Center in Los Angeles, on February 8, 2009, honoring the best in music for the recording year beginning October 1, 2007, through September 30, 2008. Robert Plant and Alison Krauss were the biggest winners of the night, winning five awards, including Album of the Year for their critically acclaimed album Raising Sand. Krauss became the sixth female solo artist to have won 5 awards in one night, joining Lauryn Hill, Alicia Keys, Norah Jones, Beyoncé Knowles, and Amy Winehouse. Lil Wayne received the most nominations, with eight.

The awards broadcast won an Emmy for Outstanding Sound Mixing for a Variety Series or Special.

Performances

Notes
Both Rihanna and Chris Brown were scheduled to perform, but their performances were canceled after Brown was arrested for his act of domestic violence against Rihanna.

Presenters
 LL Cool J
 Duffy
 Whitney Houston
 T-Pain
 Al Green
 Natalie Cole
 Kanye West
 Herbie Hancock
 Green Day
 Blink-182
 Sean Combs
 Morgan Freeman
 Charlie Haden
 Estelle
 Jack Black
 Zooey Deschanel
 will.i.am
 Queen Latifah
 Sheryl Crow
 LeAnn Rimes
 Miley Cyrus
 Taylor Swift
 Gwyneth Paltrow
 Craig Ferguson
 Simon Baker

Awards

Special merit awards
MusiCares Person of the Year
Neil Diamond

Lifetime Achievement Award winners
 Gene Autry
 The Blind Boys of Alabama
 The Four Tops
 Hank Jones
 Brenda Lee
 Dean Martin
 Tom Paxton

Trustees Award winners
 George Avakian
 Elliott Carter
 Allen Toussaint

Technical Grammy Award winners
 Clarence "Leo" Fender
 Universal Audio

President's Merit Award
Clive Davis

General
For all of these there are both nominees and winners, the winners are in bold.

Record of the Year
 "Please Read the Letter" – Robert Plant & Alison Krauss
T Bone Burnett, producer; Mike Piersante, engineer/mixer
 "Chasing Pavements" – Adele
 Eg White, producer; Tom Elmhirst & Steve Price, engineer/mixers
 "Viva la Vida" – Coldplay
Markus Dravs, Brian Eno & Rik Simpson, producers; Michael Brauer & Rik Simpson, engineers/mixers
 "Bleeding Love" – Leona Lewis
 Simon Cowell, Clive Davis & Ryan "Alias" Tedder, producers; Craig Durrance, Phil Tan & Ryan "Alias" Tedder, engineers/mixers
 "Paper Planes" – M.I.A.
 Diplo, producer; Switch, engineer/mixer

Album of the Year
 Raising Sand – Robert Plant & Alison Krauss T Bone Burnett, producer; Mike Piersante, engineer/mixer; Gavin Lurssen, mastering engineer Viva la Vida or Death and All His Friends – Coldplay
 Markus Dravs, Brian Eno & Rik Simpson, producers; Michael H. Brauer, Markus Dravs, John O'Mahoney, Rik Simpson & Andy Wallace, engineers/mixers; Bob Ludwig, mastering engineer
 Tha Carter III – Lil Wayne
 Babyface, Brisco, Fabolous, Jay-Z, Kidd Kidd, Busta Rhymes, Juelz Santana, D. Smith, Static Major, T-Pain & Bobby Valentino, featured artists; Alchemist, David Banner, Vaushaun "Maestro" Brooks, Cool & Dre, Andrews "Drew" Correa, Shondrae "Mr. Bangladesh" Crawford, Darius "Deezle" Harrison, Jim Jonsin, Mousa, Pro Jay, Rodnae, Skillz & Play, D. Smith, Swizz Beatz, Robin Thicke, T-Pain & Kanye West, producers; Angel Aponte, Joshua Berkman, Andrew Dawson, Joe G, Darius "Deezle" Harrison, Fabian Marasciullo, Miguel Scott, Robin Thicke, Julian Vasquez & Gina Victoria, engineers/mixers; Vlado Meller, mastering engineer
 Year of the Gentleman – Ne-Yo
 Chuck Harmony, Ne-Yo, Polow Da Don, StarGate, Stereotypes, Syience, Shea Taylor & Shomari "Sho" Wilson, producers; Kirven Arrington, Jeff Chestek, Kevin "KD" Davis, Mikkel Eriksen, Jaymz Hardy Martin, III, Geno Regist, Phil Tan & Tony Terrebonne, engineers/mixers; Herb Powers, Jr., mastering engineer
 In Rainbows – Radiohead
 Nigel Godrich, producer; Nigel Godrich, Dan Grech-Marguerat, Hugo Nicolson & Richard Woodcraft, engineers/mixers; Bob Ludwig, mastering engineer

Song of the Year"Viva la Vida" Guy Berryman, Jonny Buckland, Will Champion & Chris Martin, songwriters (Coldplay) "American Boy" 
 William Adams, Keith Harris, Josh Lopez, Caleb Speir, John Stephens, Estelle Swaray & Kanye West, songwriters (Estelle featuring Kanye West)
"Chasing Pavements"
 Adele Adkins & Eg White, songwriters (Adele)
"I'm Yours" 
 Jason Mraz, songwriter (Jason Mraz)
"Love Song" 
 Sara Bareilles, songwriter (Sara Bareilles)

Best New ArtistAdeleDuffy
Jonas Brothers
Lady Antebellum
Jazmine Sullivan

Pop
Best Female Pop Vocal Performance"Chasing Pavements" – Adele"Love Song" - Sara Bareilles
"Mercy" - Duffy
"Bleeding Love" - Leona Lewis
"I Kissed a Girl" - Katy Perry
"So What" - Pink

Best Male Pop Vocal Performance"Say" – John Mayer"All Summer Long" - Kid Rock
"That Was Me" - Paul McCartney
"I'm Yours" - Jason Mraz
"Closer" - Ne-Yo
"Wichita Lineman" - James Taylor

Best Pop Performance by a Duo or Group with Vocals"Viva la Vida" – Coldplay"Waiting in the Weeds" - Eagles
"Going On" - Gnarls Barkley
"Won't Go Home Without You" - Maroon 5
"Apologize" - OneRepublic

Best Pop Collaboration with Vocals"Rich Woman" – Robert Plant & Alison Krauss"Lesson Learned" - Alicia Keys & John Mayer
"4 Minutes" - Madonna, Justin Timberlake & Timbaland
"If I Never See Your Face Again" - Maroon 5 & Rihanna
"No Air" - Jordin Sparks & Chris Brown

Best Pop Instrumental Performance"I Dreamed There Was No War" – Eagles"Love Appetite" - Steve Cropper & Felix Cavaliere
"Fortune Teller"- Fourplay
"Steppin' Out" - Stanley Jordan
"Blast!" - Marcus Miller

Best Pop Instrumental AlbumJingle All the Way – Béla Fleck and the FlecktonesSax for Stax - Gerald Albright
Greatest Hits Rerecorded Volume One - Larry Carlton
The Spice of Life - Earl Klugh
A Night Before Christmas - Spyro Gyra

Best Pop Vocal AlbumRockferry – DuffyDetours - Sheryl Crow
Long Road Out of Eden - Eagles
Spirit - Leona Lewis
Covers - James Taylor

Dance
Best Dance Recording"Harder, Better, Faster, Stronger (Alive 2007)" – Daft Punk"Ready for the Floor" - Hot Chip
"Just Dance" - Lady Gaga & Colby O' Donis
"Give It 2 Me" - Madonna
"Disturbia" - Rihanna
"Black & Gold" - Sam Sparro

Best Electronic/Dance AlbumAlive 2007 – Daft PunkNew York City - Brazilian Girls
Bring Ya to the Brink - Cyndi Lauper
X - Kylie Minogue
Last Night - Moby
Robyn - Robyn

Traditional Pop
Best Traditional Pop Vocal AlbumStill Unforgettable – Natalie ColeThe Sinatra Project - Michael Feinstein
Noël - Josh Groban
In the Swing of Christmas - Barry Manilow
Rufus Does Judy at Carnegie Hall - Rufus Wainwright

Rock
Best Solo Rock Vocal Performance"Gravity" – John Mayer"I Saw Her Standing There" - Paul McCartney
"Girls in Their Summer Clothes" Bruce Springsteen
"Rise" - Eddie Vedder
"No Hidden Path" - Neil Young
Best Rock Performance by a Duo or Group with Vocal"Sex on Fire" – Kings of Leon"Rock N' Roll Train" - AC/DC
"Violet Hill" - Coldplay
"Long Road Out of Eden" - Eagles
"House of Cards" - Radiohead

Best Hard Rock Performance
"Inside the Fire" - Disturbed
"Visions" - Judas Priest"Wax Simulacra" – The Mars Volta"Saints of Los Angeles" - Mötley Crüe
"Lords of Salem" - Rob Zombie

Best Metal Performance
"Heroes of Our Time" - DragonForce
"Nostradamus" - Judas Priest"My Apocalypse" – Metallica"Under My Thumb" - Ministry
"Psychosocial" - Slipknot

Best Rock Instrumental Performance
"Castellorizon" - David Gilmour
"Suicide & Redemption" - Metallica
"34 Ghosts I-IV" - Nine Inch Nails
"Hope (Live For The Art Of Peace)" - Rush"Peaches En Regalia" – Zappa Plays Zappa featuring Steve Vai & Napoleon Murphy BrockBest Rock Song"Girls in Their Summer Clothes" – Bruce Springsteen"House of Cards - Radiohead
"I Will Possess Your Heart" - Death Cab for Cutie
"Sex on Fire" - Kings of Leon
"Violet Hill" - Coldplay

Best Rock AlbumViva la Vida or Death and All His Friends – ColdplayRock N Roll Jesus - Kid Rock
Only By The Night - Kings of Leon
Death Magnetic - Metallica
Consolers of the Lonely - The Raconteurs

Alternative
Best Alternative Music AlbumIn Rainbows - RadioheadModern Guilt - Beck
Narrow Stairs - Death Cab for Cutie
The Odd Couple - Gnarls Barkley
Evil Urges - My Morning Jacket

R&B
Best Female R&B Vocal Performance"Superwoman" – Alicia Keys"Me, Myself and I" (Live) – Beyoncé
"Heaven Sent" – Keyshia Cole
"Spotlight" – Jennifer Hudson
"Need U Bad" – Jazmine Sullivan

Best Male R&B Vocal Performance"Miss Independent" – Ne-Yo"You're the Only One" – Eric Benét
"Take You Down" – Chris Brown
"Can't Help But Wait" – Trey Songz
"Here I Stand" – Usher

Best R&B Performance by a Duo or Group with Vocal"Stay with Me (By the Sea)" – Al Green & John Legend"Ribbon in the Sky" - Boyz II Men
"Words" - Anthony David & India.Arie
"I'm His Only Woman" - Jennifer Hudson & Fantasia
"Never Give You Up" - Raphael Saadiq feat. Stevie Wonder & CJ Hilton

Best Traditional R&B Vocal Performance"You've Got the Love I Need" – Al Green & Anthony Hamilton"A Change is Gonna Come" - Wayne Brady
"Baby I Know" - Linda Jones with Helen Bruner & Terry Jones
"Love That Girl" - Raphael Saadiq
"In Love With Another Man" - Jazmine Sullivan

Best Urban/Alternative Performance"Be OK" – Chrisette Michele & will.i.am"Say Goodbye to Love" - Kenna
"Wanna Be" - Maiysha
"Many Moons" - Janelle Monáe
"Lovin You (Music)" - Wayna & Kokayi

Best R&B Song"Miss Independent" – Ne-Yo"Bust Your Windows" - Jazmine Sullivan
"Customer" - Raheem DeVaughn
"Heaven Sent" - Keyshia Cole
"Spotlight - Jennifer Hudson

Best R&B AlbumJennifer Hudson – Jennifer HudsonLove & Life - Eric Benét
Motown: A Journey Through Hitsville USA - Boyz II Men
Lay It Down - Al Green
The Way I See It - Raphael Saadiq

Best Contemporary R&B AlbumGrowing Pains – Mary J. BligeBack of My Lac' - J. Holiday
First Love - Karina
Year of the Gentleman - Ne-Yo
Fearless - Jazmine Sullivan

Rap
Best Rap Solo Performance
 "A Milli" – Lil Wayne "Roc Boys (And the Winner Is)..." – Jay-Z
 "Paris, Tokyo" – Lupe Fiasco
 "N.I.*.*.E.R. (The Slave and the Master)" – Nas
 "Sexual Eruption" – Snoop Dogg

Best Rap Performance by a Duo or Group
 "Swagga Like Us" – Jay-Z & T.I. featuring Kanye West & Lil Wayne "Royal Flush (song) – Big Boi featuring Raekwon & Andre 3000
 "Mr. Carter – Lil Wayne featuring Jay-Z
 "Wish You Would" – Ludacris featuring T.I.
 "Put On" – Young Jeezy featuring Kanye West

Best Rap/Sung Collaboration"American Boy" – Estelle featuring Kanye West"Low" – Flo Rida featuring T-Pain
"Green Light" – John Legend & Andre 3000
"Got Money" – Lil Wayne featuring T-Pain
"Superstar" – Lupe Fiasco featuring Matthew Santos

Best Rap Song
 "Lollipop" D. Carter, S. Garrett, D. Harrison, J. Scheffer & R. Zamor, songwriters (Lil Wayne featuring Static Major) "Low"
 T. Dillard, M. Humphrey & T-Pain, songwriters (Flo Rida featuring T-Pain)
 "Sexual Eruption"
 Calvin Broadus, S. Lovejoy & D. Stewart, songwriters (Snoop Dogg)
 "Superstar"
 Lupe Fiasco & Soundtrakk, songwriters (Lupe Fiasco featuring Matthew Santos)
 "Swagga Like Us"
 D. Carter, S. Carter, Clifford Harris & Kanye West, songwriters (M. Arulpragasam, N. Headon, M. Jones, J. Mellor, T. Pentz & P. Simonon, songwriters) (Jay-Z & T.I. featuring Kanye West & Lil Wayne)

Best Rap Album
 Tha Carter III – Lil Wayne American Gangster – Jay-Z
 The Cool – Lupe Fiasco
 Nas – Nas
 Paper Trail – T.I.

Country
Best Female Country Vocal Performance"Last Name" – Carrie Underwood"For These Times" - Martina McBride
"What I Cannot Change" - LeAnn Rimes
"Last Call" - Lee Ann Womack
"This Is Me You're Talking To" - Trisha Yearwood

Best Male Country Vocal Performance"Letter to Me" – Brad Paisley"You're Gonna Miss This" - Trace Adkins
"In Color" - Jamey Johnson
"Just Got Started Lovin' You" - James Otto
"Troubadour" - George Strait

Best Country Performance by a Duo or Group with Vocal
 "Stay" – Sugarland"God Must Be Busy" - Brooks & Dunn
"Love Don't Live Here" - Lady Antebellum
"Every Day" - Rascal Flatts
"Blue Side of the Mountain" - The Steel Drivers

Best Country Collaboration with Vocals"Killing the Blues" – Robert Plant & Alison Krauss"Shiftwork" - Kenny Chesney & George Strait
"House of Cash" - George Strait & Patty Loveless
"Life in a Northern Town" - Sugarland, featuring Jake Owen & Little Big Town
"Let the Wind Chase You" - Trisha Yearwood & Keith Urban

Best Country Instrumental Performance"Cluster Pluck" – Brad Paisley, James Burton, Vince Gill, John Jorgenson, Albert Lee, Brent Mason, Redd Volkaert & Steve Wariner"Sumatra" - Cherryholmes
"Two Small Cars In Rome" - Jerry Douglas & Lloyd Green
"Sleigh Ride" - Béla Fleck & The Flecktones
"Is This America? (Katrina 2005)" - Charlie Haden, Pat Metheny, Jerry Douglas & Bruce Hornsby

Best Country Song"Stay" – Jennifer Nettles, songwriter (Sugarland)
"Dig Two Graves" - Randy Travis
"I Saw God Today" - George Strait
"In Color" - Jamey Johnson
"You're Gonna Miss This" - Trace Adkins

Best Country AlbumTroubadour – George StraitThat Lonesome Song - Jamey Johnson
Sleepless Nights - Patty Loveless
Around the Bend - Randy Travis
Heaven, Heartache and the Power of Love - Trisha Yearwood

Best Bluegrass AlbumHonoring the Fathers of Bluegrass: Tribute to 1946 and 1947 – Ricky Skaggs & Kentucky ThunderCherryholmes III: Don't Believe - Cherryholmes
Del McCoury Band — Live At The 2008 New Orleans Jazz & Heritage Festival - Del McCoury Band
The Ultimate Collection / Live At The Ryman - Earl Scruggs
Wheels - Dan Tyminski

New Age
Best New Age AlbumPeace Time – Jack DeJohnetteMeditations - William Ackerman
Pathfinder - Will Clipman
Ambrosia - Peter Kater
The Scent of Light - Ottmar Liebert & Luna Negra

Jazz
Best Contemporary Jazz Album
 Randy in Brasil – Randy Brecker Floating Point – John McLaughlin
 Cannon Re–Loaded: All–Star Celebration of Cannonball Adderley – Various Artists
 Miles from India – Various Artists
 Lifecycle – Yellowjackets featuring Mike Stern

Best Jazz Vocal Album
 Loverly – Cassandra Wilson Imagina: Songs of Brasil – Karrin Allyson
 Breakfast on the Morning Tram – Stacey Kent
 If Less Is More...Nothing Is Everything – Kate McGarry
 Distances – Norma Winstone

Best Jazz Instrumental Solo
 "Be–Bop" – Terence Blanchard "Seven Steps to Heaven" – Till Brönner
 "Waltz for Debby" – Gary Burton & Chick Corea
 "Son of Thirteen" – Pat Metheny
 "Be–Bop" – James Moody

Best Jazz Instrumental Album, Individual or Group
 The New Crystal Silence – Chick Corea & Gary Burton History, Mystery – Bill Frisell
 Brad Mehldau Trio Live – Brad Mehldau Trio
 Day Trip – Pat Metheny featuring Christian McBride & Antonio Sánchez
 Standards – Alan Pasqua, Dave Carpenter & Peter Erskine

Best Large Jazz Ensemble Album
 Monday Night Live at the Village Vanguard – Vanguard Jazz OrchestraBest Latin Jazz Album
 Song for Chico – Arturo O'Farrill and The Afro–Latin Jazz OrchestraGospel
Best Gospel Performance
 "Get Up" – Mary Mary "East to West" - Casting Crowns
 "I Understand" - Kim Burrell, Rance Allen, BeBe Winans, Mariah Carey, & Hezekiah Walker's LFC
 "Shall We Gather at the River" - Take 6
 "Waging War" - CeCe Winans

Best Gospel Song
 "Help Me Believe" – Kirk Franklin Kirk Franklin, songwriter "Cover Me" - 21:03 with Fred Hammond, Smokie Norful, & J Moss
 James L. Moss, songwriter
 "Get Up" - Mary Mary
 Erica Campbell, Tina Campbell, Warryn Campbell, & Eric Dawkins, songwriters
 "Give Me Your Eyes" - Brandon Heath
 Brandon Heath & Jason Ingram, songwriters
 "You Reign" - MercyMe
 Jim Bryson, Steven Curtis Chapman, Nathan Cochran, Barry Graul, Bart Millard, Mike Scheuchzer, & Robby Shaffer, songwriters

Best Rock or Rap Gospel Album
 Alive and Transported – tobyMac Hello - After Edmund
 Our World: Redeemed - Flame
 We Need Each Other - Sanctus Real
 Rock What You Got - Superchick

Best Pop/Contemporary Gospel Album
 Thy Kingdom Come – CeCe Winans This Moment - Steven Curtis Chapman
 What If We - Brandon Heath
 Opposite Way - Leeland
 Hello Love - Chris Tomlin

Best Southern, Country, or Bluegrass Gospel Album
 Lovin' Life – Gaither Vocal Band Room For More - Booth Brothers
 Steps to Heaven - Charlie Louvin
 Hymned Again - Bart Millard
 Ephesians One - Karen Peck and New River

Best Traditional Gospel Album
 Down in New Orleans – The Blind Boys of Alabama I'll Say Yes - Carol Cymbala & The Brooklyn Tabernacle Choir
 Take It Back - Dorinda Clark-Cole
 Voices in Unity: Together In Worship - Deitrick Haddon
 No Limit - Bishop Charles E. Blake presents the West Angeles Church of God in Christ Choir

Best Contemporary R&B Gospel Album
 The Fight of My Life – Kirk Franklin Reflections - Jason Champion
 The Sound - Mary Mary
 Donald Lawrence Introduces: Family Prayer - The Murrills
 Stand Out - Tye Tribbett & G.A.

Latin
Best Latin Pop AlbumLa Vida... Es Un Ratico – JuanesBest Latin Rock or Alternative Album
 45 – Jaguares

Best Latin Urban Album
 Los Extraterrestres – Wisin & Yandel

Best Tropical Latin Album
 Señor Bachata – José Feliciano

Best Regional Mexican Album
 Amor, Dolor y Lágrimas: Música Ranchera – Mariachi los Camperos de Nati Cano
 Canciones de Amor – Mariachi Divas

Best Tejano Album
 Viva La Revolucion – Ruben Ramos & The Mexican Revolution

Best Norteño Album
 Raíces – Los Tigres del Norte

Best Banda Album
 No Es De Madera – Joan Sebastian

Blues
Best Traditional Blues AlbumOne Kind Favor – B.B. KingThe Blues Rolls On - Elvin Bishop
Skin Deep - Buddy Guy
All Odds Against Me - John Lee Hooker, Jr.
Pinetop Perkins and Friends - Pinetop Perkins and Friends

Best Contemporary Blues AlbumCity That Care Forgot – Dr. John And The Lower 911Peace Love & BBQ - Marcia Ball
Like a Fire - Solomon Burke
Maesteo - Taj Mahal
Simply Grand - Irma Thomas

Folk
Best Traditional Folk Album"At 89" – Pete Seeger"Coal"-Kathy Mattea
"Comedians & Angels"-Tom Paxton
"Bring Me Home"-Peggy Seeger
"Strangers In Another Country"-Rosalie Sorrels

Best Contemporary Folk/Americana Album"Raising Sand"- Robert Plant & Alison Krauss"Day After Tomorrow"- Joan Baez
"I, Flathead"- Ry Cooder
"Sex & Gasoline"- Rodney Crowell
"All I Intended to Be"- Emmylou Harris

Best Native American Music Album
Come to Me Great Mystery: Native American Healing Songs – Various artists (Tom Wasinger, producer)

Best Hawaiian Music AlbumIkena – Tia Carrere & Daniel Ho

Best Zydeco or Cajun Music Album
Live at the 2008 New Orleans Jazz & Heritage Festival – BeauSoleil & Michael Doucet

Reggae
Best Reggae AlbumJah Is Real – Burning SpearLet's Get Physical - Elephant Man 
Vibes - Heavy D
Repentance - Lee "Scratch" Perry
Intoxication - Shaggy
Amazing - Sly and Robbie

World music
Best Traditional World Music Album
 Ilembe: Honoring Shaka Zulu – Ladysmith Black Mambazo

Best Contemporary World Music Album
 Global Drum Project – Mickey Hart, Zakir Hussain, Sikiru Adepoju & Giovanni Hidalgo
nominee Angels & Almas – David Maldonado

Polka
Best Polka Album
 Let the Whole World Sing – Jimmy Sturr and His OrchestraChildren's
Best Musical Album For ChildrenHere Come the 123s – They Might Be GiantsBest Spoken Word Album for ChildrenYes To Running! Bill Harley Live – Bill HarleySpoken word
Best Spoken Word Album
 An Inconvenient Truth – Beau Bridges, Cynthia Nixon & Blair Underwood

Comedy
Best Comedy Album
 It's Bad for Ya – George Carlin Anticipation - Lewis Black
 Flight of the Conchords - Flight of the Conchords
 For Your Consideration - Kathy Griffin
 Songs of the Bushmen - Harry Shearer

Musical show
Best Musical Show Album
 In the Heights – Original Broadway Cast with Lin-Manuel Miranda & Others
 Kurt Deutsch, Alex Lacamoire, Andrés Levin, Lin-Manuel Miranda, Joel Moss & Bill Sherman, producers; Lin-Manuel Miranda, composer/lyricist

Film, television and other visual media
Best Compilation Soundtrack Album for Motion Picture, Television or Other Visual MediaJunoAmerican Gangster
August Rush
Mamma Mia!
Sweeney Todd — The Demon Barber Of Fleet Street

Best Score Soundtrack Album for Motion Picture, Television or Other Visual MediaThe Dark Knight - James Newton Howard & Hans ZimmerIndiana Jones and the Kingdom of the Crystal Skull - John Williams
Iron Man - Ramin Djawadi
There Will Be Blood - Jonny Greenwood
WALL-E - Thomas Newman

Best Song Written for Motion Picture, Television or Other Visual Media"Down to Earth" (from WALL-E) – Peter Gabriel"Ever Ever After" (from Enchanted) - Carrie Underwood
"Say" - (from The Bucket List) - John Mayer
"That's How You Know" (from Enchanted) - Amy Adams
"Walk Hard" (from Walk Hard: The Dewey Cox Story) - John C. Reilly

Composing and arranging
Best Instrumental Composition
 "The Adventures of Mutt" (from Indiana Jones and the Kingdom of the Crystal Skull) – John Williams
 John Williams, composer

Best Instrumental Arrangement
 "Define Dancing" (from WALL-E) – Thomas Newman
 Peter Gabriel & Thomas Newman, arrangers

Best Pop Instrumental Arrangement Accompanying Vocalist(s)
 "Captain Of Her Heart" – Project Grand Slam & Judie Tzuke

Package
Best Recording Package
Death Magnetic – Bruce Duckworth, Sarah Moffatt & David Turner, art directors (Metallica)

Best Boxed or Special Limited Edition Package
In Rainbows – Stanley Donwood, Mel Maxwell & Xian Munro, art directors (Radiohead)

Album notes
Best Album Notes
 Kind Of Blue: 50th Anniversary Collector's Edition – Francis Davis, album notes writer (Miles Davis)

Historical
Best Historical Album
 Art Of Field Recording Volume I: Fifty Years Of Traditional American Music Documented By Art Rosenbaum – Steven Lance Ledbetter & Art Rosenbaum, compilation producers; Michael Graves, mastering engineer (Various Artists)

Production, non-classical
Best Engineered Album, Non-Classical
 Consolers of the Lonely – The Raconteurs
 Joe Chiccarelli, Vance Powell & Jack White III, engineers

Producer of the Year, Non-ClassicalRick Rubin'''
 Death Magnetic (Metallica)
 Home Before Dark (Neil Diamond)
 Mercy (Dancing for the Death of an Imaginary Enemy) (Ours)
 Seeing Things (Jakob Dylan)
 Weezer (Red Album) (Weezer)

Best Remixed Recording, Non-Classical
 "Electric Feel" (Justice Remix)
 (MGMT), remixers Justice

Production, surround sound
Best Surround Sound Album
 Mussorgsky: Pictures at an Exhibition; Night on Bald Mountain; Prelude to Khovanshchina – Paavo Järvi & Cincinnati Symphony Orchestra – Michael Bishop & Robert Woods

Production, classical
Best Engineered Album, Classical
 David Frost, Tom Lazarus & Christopher Willis – Traditions and Transformations: Sounds of Silk Road Chicago – Miguel Harth-Bedoya, Alan Gilbert, Silk Road Ensemble, Wu Man, Yo-Yo Ma & Chicago Symphony Orchestra

Producer of the Year, Classical
 David Frost
 Berlioz: Symphonie fantastique – Gustavo Dudamel & Los Angeles Philharmonic
 Right Through The Bone—Julius Röntgen Chamber Music
 Schubert: Sonata in D major; Liszt: Don Juan Fantasy – Min Kwon
 Traditions And Transformations: Sounds Of Silk Road Chicago – Miguel Harth-Bedoya, Alan Gilbert, Yo-Yo Ma, Silk Road Ensemble, Wu Man & Chicago Symphony Orchestra

Classical
Best Classical Album
 Kurt Weill: Rise and Fall of the City of Mahagonny – James Conlon, conductor

Best Orchestral Performance
 Bernard Haitink, conductor (Chicago Symphony Orchestra) – Shostakovich: Symphony No. 4Best Opera Recording
 Weill: Rise and Fall of the City of Mahagonny – James Conlon, conductor; Fred Vogler, producer; Anthony Dean Griffey, Patti LuPone & Audra McDonald – Donnie Ray Albert, John Easterlin, Steven Humes, Mel Ulrich & Robert Wörle Los Angeles Opera Orchestra and Chorus

Best Choral Performance
 Symphony of Psalms – Sir Simon Rattle, conductor; Simon Halsey, chorus master – Berlin Philharmonic; Rundfunkchor Berlin

Best Instrumental Soloist(s) Performance (With Orchestra)
 Esa-Pekka Salonen, conductor; Hilary Hahn (Swedish Radio Symphony Orchestra) – Schoenberg/Sibelius: Violin ConcertosBest Instrumental Soloist Performance (Without Orchestra)
 Gloria Cheng – Piano music of Salonen, Stucky, and LutosławskiBest Chamber Music Performance
 Pacifica Quartet – Elliott Carter: String Quartets Nos. 1 and 5Best Small Ensemble Performance
 Charles Bruffy, conductor; Phoenix Chorale – Spotless Rose: Hymns To The Virgin MaryBest Classical Vocal Performance
 Hila Plitmann – Mr. Tambourine Man: Seven Poems of Bob Dylan – JoAnn Falletta (Buffalo Philharmonic Orchestra)

Best Classical Contemporary Composition
 Mr. Tambourine Man: Seven Poems of Bob Dylan – John Corigliano (JoAnn Falletta)

Classical Crossover Album
 Simple Gifts – King's Singers

Music video
Best Short Form Music Video
 "Pork and Beans" – Weezer
 Mathew Cullen, video director; Bernard Rahill, video producer

Best Long Form Music Video
 Runnin' Down a Dream'' – Tom Petty & The Heartbreakers
 Peter Bogdanovich, video director; Skot Bright, video producer

Records
 Alison Krauss became the sixth female solo artist to have won five Grammys in one evening. The artists who won five before her are Lauryn Hill, Alicia Keys, Norah Jones, Beyoncé Knowles, and Amy Winehouse. However, at the ceremony (2010 Grammy Awards) next year, Beyoncé surpassed the record by gaining six such awards.

In Memoriam
George Carlin, Jerry Wexler, Jerry Reed, Mike Smith, Rick Wright, Eartha Kitt, Buddy Miles, Mitch Mitchell, Earl Palmer, Buddy Harman, Freddie Hubbard, David "Fathead" Newman, Johnny Griffin, Jimmy McGriff, Mike Berniker, Teo Macero, Eddy Arnold, Nick Reynolds, Miriam Makeba, Odetta, Pervis Jackson, Cachao López, Norman Smith, Neil Aspinall, William Claxton, Neal Hefti, Jo Stafford, Levi Stubbs, Jheryl Busby, Norman Whitfield, Claude Jeter, Ira Tucker, Dottie Rambo, Larry Norman, Merl Saunders, F.M. Scott III, Delaney Bramlett, Alton Ellis, Shakir Stewart, Static Major, Leonard Pennario, Norman Dello Joio, Alexander Slobodyanik, Henry Z. Steinway, Earle Hagen, Isaac Hayes, Danny Federici and Bo Diddley.

Trivia
The four Grammys Lil Wayne won were the first ever Grammy Award wins in his Career.
George Strait also won his first ever Grammy Award.
After a four-year hiatus, pop-punk band Blink-182 announced their reunion before giving the award for rock album of the year to alternative rock band Coldplay.
LeRoi Moore, saxophonist for the Dave Matthews band, died on August 19, 2008. The video tribute to musicians who had died in the previous year excluded Moore, disappointing and angering fans. Neil Portnow, president of the National Academy of Recording Arts and Sciences, responded with a statement noting that Moore was included in a list of deceased musicians in the program for the event, and "unfortunately we are unable to include all of the talented and wonderful people within the allotted timeframe." This created a tremendous outrage from the band's fans and many other music celebrities.

Artists with multiple nominations and awards 

The following artists received multiple nominations:
Eight: Lil Wayne
Seven: Coldplay
Six: Jay-Z, Ne-Yo and Kanye West
Five: Alison Krauss, John Mayer, Robert Plant, Radiohead and Jazmine Sullivan
Four: Adele, Danger Mouse, Eagles, Lupe Fiasco, George Strait, and Stargate, T.I.

The following artists received multiple awards:
Five: Alison Krauss and Robert Plant
Four: Lil Wayne
Three: Coldplay
Two: Adele, John Mayer, Ne-Yo, Daft Punk

References

External links
  Official Site
 Winners
 NARAS
 CBS GRAMMY Site

 051
2009 in American music
2009 in California
2009 music awards
2009 in Los Angeles
2009 awards in the United States
February 2009 events in the United States